SS Donald W. Bain was a Liberty ship built in the United States during World War II. She was named after Donald W. Bain, a state Treasurer of North Carolina.

Construction
Donald W. Bain was laid down on 17 April 1944, under a Maritime Commission (MARCOM) contract, MC hull 2360, by J.A. Jones Construction, Brunswick, Georgia; she was sponsored by Alice Willson Broughton, wife of J. Melville Broughton the Governor of North Carolina and a grandniece of the ship's eponym, and launched on 25 May 1944.

History
She was allocated to the Norton Lilly Management Corp., on 17 June 1944. On 31 January 1947, she was sold to the Cosmopolitan Shipping Co., Inc. She was resold to the Dolphin Steamship Corp., 23 February 1949, and renamed Lilica. She was wrecked on 25 December 1951, off Civitavecchia, and declared a constructive total loss (CTL) but rebuilt. She was again sold on 29 July 1952, to the Italian shipping company Societe Di Navigazione Tito Campanella, where she was renamed Elisa Camanella, and converted to a motor ship in 1955. She was scrapped in 1969.

References

Bibliography

 
 
 
 
 

 

Liberty ships
Ships built in Brunswick, Georgia
1944 ships
Maritime incidents in 1951